Robert Carrier (born June 3, 1941) is a Canadian politician, engineer, political adviser, and a project coordinator. Carrier was a Bloc Québécois member of the House of Commons of Canada from 2004 until 2011.

Born in Montreal, Quebec, Carrier was first elected in the 2004 federal election in the riding of Alfred-Pellan in Laval, Quebec. However, he was defeated in the 2011 election by NDP's Rosane Doré Lefebvre. Carrier stood as a candidate for the Parti Québécois in the Mille-Îles electoral district during the 2012 Quebec election. On election night, he placed second behind the winner, Francine Charbonneau of the Liberals.

Electoral record (partial)

External links
 
How'd They Vote?: Robert Carrier's voting history and quotes

1941 births
Bloc Québécois MPs
French Quebecers
Living people
Members of the House of Commons of Canada from Quebec
Politicians from Laval, Quebec
Politicians from Montreal
21st-century Canadian politicians